Cape Baba or Cape Lecton, is the westernmost point of the Turkish mainland, making it the westernmost point of Asia. It is located at the village of Babakale ("Father Castle"), Ayvacık, Çanakkale, in the historical area of the Troad. There was a lighthouse at Cape Baba that was called Lekton (Latinized as Lectum) in classical times, anglicised as Cape Lecture.

Cape Lecton is mentioned in Homer's Iliad, and by many ancient writers and geographers, including Herodotus, Thucydides, Aristotle, Livy, Plutarch, Strabo, Pliny the Elder, Athenaeus and Ptolemaeus.

The Acts of the Apostles records a journey around the Cape from Troas to Assos undertaken by Luke the Evangelist and his companions, while Paul the Apostle took the journey over land. The Jamieson-Fausset-Brown Bible Commentary explains:

See also
Babakale, Ayvacık
Babakale Castle

References

External links

Babakale (near Cape Baba)

Baba
Extreme points of Asia
Landforms of Çanakkale Province
Locations in the Iliad